Erico Menczer (8 May 1926 - 10 March 2012) was an Italian film cinematographer.

Born in Fiume (later Rijeka) as Erik, he was forced by the fascist phobia for the foreign culture to change his name.  At the end of the Second World War, when the city of Fiume became Yugoslav, he first moved to Padua, then to Genoa, and finally to Rome, where he began his film career.

After having worked as a camera operator, Menczer made his debut as a cinematographer in 1960 with the comedy film Le pillole di Ercole directed by Luciano Salce, with whom he had a professional association that characterized his career in the following decades. He also worked, among others, with Federico Fellini, Mario Monicelli, Michelangelo Antonioni and Dario Argento.

References

External links 
 

1926 births
2012 deaths
Italian cinematographers
People from Rijeka